Robert Briglia is an Australian international lawn and indoor bowler.

Bowls career
In 2019, he won the Australian National indoor title, which qualified him to represent Australia at the 2022 World Bowls Indoor Championships. The event had been cancelled in 2020 and 2021 due to the COVID-19 pandemic.

References

Australian male bowls players
Living people
Year of birth missing (living people)